Jacek Mickiewicz (born 17 April 1970) is a Polish former road racing cyclist. He was professional from 1995 until 2004. Before he was professional, he appeared at the 1992 Summer Olympics, finished 22nd in the road race.

Palmarès

References

External links 

1970 births
Living people
Polish male cyclists
People from Dzierżoniów
Cyclists at the 1992 Summer Olympics
Olympic cyclists of Poland
Sportspeople from Lower Silesian Voivodeship